Sikh Ajaibghar or Sikh Museum is situated at Balongi village, near SAS Nagar (formerly Mohali) Punjab, India. The museum showcases sculptures of various Sikh warriors and Sikh freedom fighters.

The Sikh Museum was inaugurated by the Punjab minister for jails, tourism and cultural affairs Hira Singh Gabria.

Photo gallery
Earlier, this museum was operating near Laknour barrier on Landran-SAS Nagar road. The picture in gallery shows images shot in its older place.

See also 

 Mehdiana Sahib
 History of Sikhism
 Sikh art and culture
 Sikh architecture

References

Sikh places
Buildings and structures in Mohali
Museums in Punjab, India
Religious museums in India